The Other Side is the only solo album by American R&B singer Sean Levert. It was released by Atlantic Records on June 20, 1995 in the United States. While Jermaine Dupri was recruited to work with the singer on the majority of the album, Levert also secured that his first album would showcase some "love-making music." Thus, he also worked with his LeVert bandmates, Marc Gordon and his brother Gerald Levert, as well as Edwin "Tony" Nicholas on several songs.

Upon release, the album earned generally positive reviews from music critics and peaked at number 22 on the US Billboard Top R&B/Hip-Hop Albums and number 146 on the Billboard Hot 100. The Other Side yielded the charting singles "Put Your Body Where Your Mouth Is" and "Same One," both of which reached the top sixty on the Hot R&B/Hip-Hop Songs. The Other Side remains Levert's only solo effort.

Background
The Other Side marked Levert's solo debut. While Jermaine Dupri was recruited to work with the singer on the majority of the album, Levert also secured that his first album would showcase some "love-making music." Thus, he also worked with his LeVert bandmates, Marc Gordon and his brother Gerald Levert, and frequent collaborator Edwin "Tony" Nicholas on several songs.

Critical reception

Andrew Hamilton from Allmusic called the album "a satisfying debut" and wrote: "He sings in a pleasant, laid-back tenor/baritone. Only ten selections, but not a sister of the poor in the bunch [...] Top shelf productions by Gerald Levert and Jermaine Dupri makes The Other Side a keeper." Vibe editor Gordon Chambers found that The Other Side "delivers the churchy, baritone soul with which his last name has become synonymous — but with a younger, trendier [...] Levert is obviously trying to compete with the risque male soul that recently scored for R. Kelly as well as the father of them all, Barry White. Levert sounds most at home, though, on the sensua but not too overdone [songs]."

Track listing

Notes
 denotes co-producer

Sample credits
"Just Can't Get Enough" contains elements from "Munchies for Your Love" by Bootsy Collins.
"Tasty Love" embodies portions of the composition "Computer Love" by Zapp.

Charts

Release history

References 

1995 debut albums
Atlantic Records albums